QDA Miner is mixed methods and qualitative data analysis software developed by Provalis Research. The program was designed to assist researchers in managing, coding and analyzing qualitative data.
 
QDA Miner was first released in 2004 after being developed by Normand Peladeau. The latest version 6 was released in September, 2020. QDA Miner is widely used for qualitative research. It is used by market researchers, survey companies, government, education researchers, crime and fraud detection experts, journalists and others.
 
The data typically used with this qualitative research software comes from (among others), journal articles, script from TV or radio news, social media (such as Facebook, Twitter or reviews from websites), interviews or focus group transcripts and open-ended questions from surveys.

Release history
 QDA Miner 1: January 2004
 QDA Miner 2: June 2006
 QDA Miner 3: October 2007
 QDA Miner 4: December 2011
 QDA Miner 4 Lite: November 2012, a free variant of QDA Miner with reduced functionality 
 QDA Miner 5: December 2016
 QDA Miner 6: September 2020

Features of QDA Miner 6 
 New Grid mode for coding shorter responses
 Quotation Matrices
 Enhanced annotation feature
 Word frequency analysis and interactive word cloud
 Importation of Nexis UNI and Factiva Files
 Improved Importation of Excel, CSV and TSV files
 Deviation Table
 Export Results to Tableau Software
 Numerical Transformation
 Binning
 Support of Missing Values
 Silhouette plot
 Date transformation
 Improved code filtering feature
 Donut, Radar, 100% Stacked Bar and Area Charts
 Ordering of series in comparison charts
 Color Coding of items in Correspondence Plot
 Improved Bubble Chart
 Link Analysis Buffer
 New Table Format and Table Editor
 Several new options and interface improvements have been made to existing dialog boxes (code color selection, graphic options, etc.), management and analysis features.

Features of QDA Miner 5
 Import different formats of documents and images: PDF, Word, Excel, HTML, RTF, SPSS files, JPEG, etc.
 Import data from Facebook, Twitter, Reddit, RSS feeds within the software
 Import from directly reference managers tools and emails
 Perform GIS mapping with qualitative data
 Text retrieval tools: Keyword Retrieval, Query-by-Example, Cluster Extraction.
 Statistical functions:  Coding frequencies, cluster analysis, coding sequences, coding by variables.
 Visualization tools: multidimensional scaling, heatmaps, correspondence analysis graphic, proximity plot.
 GeoTagging (GIS) and Time-Tagging tools
 Report manager tool to store queries and analysis results, tables and graphs, research notes and quotes.

References

QDA software
Science software for Windows